The 2013 Campeonato Pernambucano, named Pernambucano Coca-Cola 2013 - Série A1 for sponsorship reasons, was the 99th edition of the state championship of Pernambuco. With the return of Copa do Nordeste in 2013 and the participation of three teams from the state (Santa Cruz, Sport and Salgueiro), the formula of this edition was not the same as the previous championship. The competition is started on January 20 and concluded on May 19. Santa Cruz won their 27th championship, with Sport as runner-up. Petrolina and Belo Jardim were relegated to the second division of Campeonato Pernambucano.

Format
In the first stage, the championship will be played in two rounds. In the first round nine clubs (excluding the teams participating in the 2013 Copa do Nordeste) play each other once. The team that finishes first gains a place in the 2014 Copa do Brasil.

The second round will feature twelve clubs, with the inclusion of Santa Cruz Futebol Clube, Sport Club do Recife and Salgueiro Atlético Clube, who play each once. The top four teams qualify for the semifinals. The eight remaining teams will play each other in a play out, where the last two are demoted to Série A2 in 2014.
In the semifinals the top four teams compete against each other in a two-game format (number one plays number four, number two plays number three). The winners of the semifinals qualify for the final which will be played over two games to decide the winner.

Participants

First round

Results

Second round

Results

Relegation tournament

Results

Final stage

Semifinals

First leg

Second leg

Third place match

Finals

References

External links
Site oficial da Federação Pernambucana de Futebol 

2013
Pernambucano